Chay Hews (born 30 September 1976) is a former Australian soccer player who played in Australia, England, Japan and Sweden.

Playing career
Hews began his senior career with Brisbane Strikers in the National Soccer League (NSL) in 1994.

Hews joined Bellmare Hiratsuka in July 1999, making his J-League debut the following month.

He returned to Australia in late 1999, making his return to the Brisbane Strikers in January 2000 after a wait for an international clearance.

In mid 2000, Hews moved to Sweden, spending six months away from football. He returned to the Strikers in December 2000, signing a contract until the end of the 2000–01 National Soccer League season.

In 2001, Hews joined Football League Division Three team Carlisle United. He was released in October, having made five appearances and scoring two goals.

Club statistics

Honours
Brisbane Strikers
National Soccer League Champion: 1996–97

References

External links

brisbanestrikers.com.au
ozfootball.net

odn.ne.jp

1976 births
Living people
Australian soccer players
Shonan Bellmare players
IF Sylvia players
Carlisle United F.C. players
Västra Frölunda IF players
J1 League players
Australian expatriate soccer players
Expatriate footballers in Japan
Expatriate footballers in Sweden
Expatriate footballers in England
Association football midfielders
Brisbane Strikers coaches